The 2014 Missouri Valley Conference men's basketball tournament, popularly referred to as "Arch Madness", as part of the 2013–14 NCAA Division I men's basketball season was played in St. Louis, Missouri March 6–9 at the Scottrade Center. The championship game was televised on CBS on Sunday March 9 at 1:05 pm (central). The tournament's winner received the Missouri Valley Conference's automatic bid to the 2014 NCAA tournament.

Tournament bracket

Game summaries

Tournament notes 
Wichita State's championship win made them the first team to enter the NCAA tournament undefeated since UNLV in 1991

Awards 
The following were honored as the top players of the tournament:
Tekele Cotton, Wichita State
Fred VanVleet, Wichita State
Cleanthony Early, Wichita State
Jake Odum, Indiana State
D.J. Balentine, Evansville

Tekele Cotton of the Wichita State Shockers was named the tournament's most outstanding player (MOP) after scoring 20 points and grabbing 3 rebounds in the championship game against Indiana State. In the game, he scored the second most points behind Fred VanVleet, who added 22.

References 

2013–14 Missouri Valley Conference men's basketball season
Missouri Valley Conference men's basketball tournament